Hannelore Elsner (born Hannelore Elstner; 26 July 1942 – 21 April 2019) was a German actress with a long career in television and film. She first performed on stage in Munich, and later starred in popular films and television series such as Die Schwarzwaldklinik (The Black Forest Clinic), and as the lead character, Inspector Lea Sommer, in the series Die Kommissarin. She was recognized internationally for her lead role in the 2000 film Die Unberührbare (No Place to Go), shown at the Cannes Film Festival.

Career 
She was born Hannelore Elstner in Burghausen on 26 July 1942. Her five-year-old brother was killed in an air raid at the end of the Second World War. Her father died from tuberculosis when she was eight.

She was the first to appear nude on stage at the Kammerspiele.

Elsner appeared in her first film, Alt Heidelberg (Old Heidelberg), in 1959 at age 17. She was discovered for more serious acting by Edgar Reitz, who cast her alongside Elke Sommer for a lead role in the 1973 film Die Reise nach Wien (Trip to Vienna), her first role outside Germany. Later she starred in films and TV series such as Die Schwarzwaldklinik (The Black Forest Clinic). Elsner is remembered for the title role, Inspector Lea Sommer, in the German detective series Die Kommissarin which aired on public television in 66 episodes from 1994 to 2006. She was the first woman to play an inspector in a television series.

Elsner achieved international recognition for her lead role in the 2000 film Die Unberührbare (No Place to Go), which recounts the last days in the life of a writer, based closely on the life of Gisela Elsner, who died by suicide in 1992. The black-and-white film was written and filmed by Gisela Elsner's son, Oskar Roehler. It was a German entry for the Cannes Film Festival, and received three film awards. Elsner's last completed film was Kirschblüten und Dämonen by Doris Dörrie; Dörrie said that Elsner was a great adventurer who threw herself into every role and her life with curiosity, dedication and bravery ("Für mich war Hannelore Elsner eine große Abenteuerin, die sich mit Neugier, Hingabe und Tapferkeit in jede Rolle und in ihr Leben gestürzt hat".)

Elsner also participated in audio plays and read audio books. She worked in an association exhorting people not to forget the Holocaust. She wrote her memoirs in 2011, titled Im Überschwang: Aus meinem Leben (In Exuberance: From My Life), which describe in detail how she grew up in Bavarian provincial surroundings and recount tragic episodes from her childhood.

Awards 

For her title role in Die Unberührbare (No Place to Go), Elsner was awarded the Deutscher Filmpreis (German Film Award) in the category Best Actress, the Deutscher Kritikerpreis (German Critics' Prize) and the 2000 Bayrischer Filmpreis (Bavarian Film Award). In 2005, she received the German Order of Merit for her campaign against AIDS. In 2006, she was awarded the Bavarian Film Award for her life's work.

Personal life and death 
Elsner was married three times: to the actor Gerd Vespermann from 1964 to 1966, to the director Alf Brustellin from the 1970s until his death in 1981, and to Uwe B. Carstensen from 1993 until their divorce in 2000. In 1981, she had a son with the director Dieter Wedel.

She died of cancer in a clinic in Munich on 21 April 2019. Hanns-Georg Rodek, in an obituary for Die Welt, described her as "a national institution ... wild, seductive and independent" ("eine nationale Institution ... wild, verführerisch und unabhängig"). The broadcaster BR changed their programming in her honour, to show films that she had appeared in as well as an interview.

Filmography 
Films in which Elsner appeared include:

 Old Heidelberg (1959), as Helene
  (1961), as Ulla
  (1961), as Yusha
 Stahlnetz:  (1962, TV series episode), as Edith Tirfelder
  (1963), as Sylvia Stössi
 An Alibi for Death (1963), as Hanne Wasneck
 Glorious Times at the Spessart Inn (1967), as Johanna
 Zur Hölle mit den Paukern (1968), as Geneviève Ponelle
  (1969, TV film), as Anacoana
 Student of the Bedroom (1970), as Brigitte
 Gentlemen in White Vests (1970), as Susan
 Willi Manages the Whole Thing (1971), as Constanze
 The Stuff That Dreams Are Made Of (1972), as Irina
  (1973), as Monika Winkler
  (1973), as The Countess
 Trip to Vienna (1973), as Marga Kroeber
 Challenge to White Fang (1974), as Jane LeClerq
 Die schöne Marianne (1975, TV series, 13 episodes), as Marianne Ruaux
  (1975), as Maria / Marlit
 Grete Minde (1977), as Trude Minde
 The Tailor from Ulm (1978), as Anna Berblinger
  (1979), as Alissa Kristlein
 The Green Bird (1980), as Dr. Renate Winter

  (1982), as Dorothea von Schög
 Satan ist auf Gottes Seite (1983, TV film), as Zimra Steffin
 Man Without Memory (1984), as Dr. Essner
 A Kind of Anger (1984, TV film), as Adele Sanger
  (1985), as Mary Ward
 Parker (1985), as Jillian Schelm
 Kaminsky (1985), as Nicole Kaminsky
  (1985), as Dr. Hoppe
  (1986), as Yvonne Duhamel
  (1988, TV series, 12 episodes), as Katharina Haltermann
 The Black Forest Clinic (1987–1988, TV series, 6 episodes), as Maria Rotenburg
 Noch ein Wunsch (1989, TV film), as Brigitte
  (1990), as Mrs. De Vries
 Death Came As a Friend (1991, TV film), as Judith
  (1992, TV film), as Polly
 Cliffs of the Death (1993, TV film), as Rita Freymuth
 Die Kommissarin (1994–2006, TV series, 66 episodes), as Lea Sommer
 Butterfly Feelings (1996, TV film), as Marie-Luise Wendt
 A Girl Called Rosemary (1996, TV film), as Marga Hartog
  (1998, TV film), as Andrea
 Kai Rabe gegen die Vatikankiller (1998), as Hilde Strassburger
 No Place to Go (2000), as Hanna Flanders
  (2001, TV film), as Waltraud
  (2002), as Marie
  (2003, TV film), as Denise
  (2003), as Barbara Bärenklau
  (2004), as Dr. Sue Süssmilch
 Alles auf Zucker! (2004), as Marlene Zuckermann
  (2004, TV film), as Beatrice Shaye
  (2005, TV film), as Polina Sieveking
  (2006), as Johanna Perl
  (2006, TV film), as Ludmilla Dimitrieff
  (2006), as Annabella Silberstein
 Vivere (2007), as Gerlinde von Habermann
  (2007), as Maria Döbereiner
 War and Peace (2008, TV miniseries), as Countess Rostova
 Cherry Blossoms (2008), as Trudi Angermeier
  (2008, TV film), as Laura Hansen
 Zeiten ändern dich (2010), as Mother
 Hanni & Nanni (2010), as Mrs. Theobald
 Der letzte Patriarch (2010, TV film), as Ruth Buchleitner
  (2010, TV film), as Martha Ebinghaus
  (2010, TV film), as Irma Bergner
  (2011), as Marga Baumanis
  (2012), as Daisy
  (2012), as Silvia
  (2014), as Ingrid
 Tour de Force (2014), as Irene
  (2014), as Wally
  (To Life, 2014), as Ruth Weintraub
  (2014, TV film), as Agnes Barner
  (2015, TV film), as Ella
  (2015), as Renate
  (2016), as Ruth Eberth
  (2016), as Liliane Wunderlich
  (2018), as Renate Konaske
  (2019), as Trudi Angermeier
 Club der einsamen Herzen (2019, TV film), as Kiki
  (2020, TV film), as Rose Just (final film role)

References

External links 

 
 
 
 
 Hannelore Elsner: Dieser ganz undeutsche Glamour (photos) Die Zeit, 23 April 2019

1942 births
2019 deaths
People from Burghausen, Altötting
German film actresses
German television actresses
Best Actress German Film Award winners
Officers Crosses of the Order of Merit of the Federal Republic of Germany
20th-century German actresses
21st-century German actresses